Dopey Dicks is a 1950 short subject directed by Edward Bernds starring American slapstick comedy team The Three Stooges (Moe Howard, Larry Fine and Shemp Howard). It is the 122nd entry in the series released by Columbia Pictures starring the comedians, who released 190 shorts for the studio between 1934 and 1959.

Plot
The Stooges are janitors who have just finished moving furniture and assorted items into the office of a detective. Shemp fantasizes about the exciting life of a private eye, when a beautiful blonde in distress (Christine McIntyre) rushes in begging for help, claiming she is being followed. While the Stooges search the hallways, she quickly scribbles a note and is captured by a mysterious figure.

The Stooges follow her note to a dark house on Mortuary Road, where an evil scientist (Philip Van Zandt) is building an army of robot men. Fanning out to search, Shemp finds the girl tied up and gagged in a curtained alcove at the end of the main hallway. The scientist and his assistant (Stanley Price) then try to dispose of the Stooges, but the Stooges overcome the odds and escape with the girl in a car driven by one of the scientist's headless robots.

Cast

 Gene Sheldon as Headless Robot (uncredited)
 William Kelley as Driving Headless Robot (uncredited)<ref
name=3net></ref>

Production notes
Dopey Dicks was filmed on January 11–14, 1949, and released nearly 14 months later on March 2, 1950.

The film's title is a spoof of Herman Melville's 1851 novel Moby-Dick. The unseen private eye is named Sam Shovel, a play on Dashiell Hammett's famed detective Sam Spade.

A colorized version of Dopey Dicks was released in 2007 as part of the DVD collection Hapless Half-Wits.

In popular culture
Dopey Dicks was one of four Stooge films included in the TBS 1992 Halloween special Three Stooges Fright Night. This short was replaced by Malice in the Palace in its 1995 airing.

References

External links
 
 

1950 films
The Three Stooges films
American black-and-white films
Films directed by Edward Bernds
Mad scientist films
1950 comedy films
Columbia Pictures short films
American comedy short films
1950s English-language films
1950s American films